The rufous-vented tapaculo (Scytalopus femoralis) is a species of bird in the family Rhinocryptidae. It is endemic to Peru.

Taxonomy and systematics

The rufous-vented tapaculo has no subspecies. However, what are now the Santa Marta tapaculo (Scytalopus sanctaemartae), long-tailed tapaculo (S. micropterus), white-crowned tapaculo (S. atratus), and Bolivian tapaculo (S. bolivianus) were formerly treated as subspecies of it.

Description

Males weigh  and females . Adults have a dark brown head and back with a dark brown wash and the rump is dark reddish brown. The throat, breast, and belly are a paler gray; flanks and vent area are cinnamon with broad dark bars. The juvenile is brown above with faint bars and yellow buff with dark bars below.

Distribution and habitat

The rufous-vented tapaculo is found in the central Andes of Peru from southern Amazonas south to Junín. There it inhabits the undergrowth of both primary and secondary humid forest.

Behavior

No information has been published about the rufous-vented tapaculo's feeding or breeding phenologies. Its song is a single descending note repeated for several minutes .

Status

The IUCN has assessed the rufous-vented tapaculo as being of Least Concern. The species has a very large range, and though the population number has not been determined, it is believed to be fairly large and stable.

References

rufous-vented tapaculo
Birds of the Peruvian Andes
Endemic birds of Peru
rufous-vented tapaculo
Taxonomy articles created by Polbot